The March 84S is a Sports 2000 prototype race car, designed, developed and built by British manufacturer March Engineering, for sports car racing, in 1984.

References

Sports prototypes